Frank Tolbert may refer to:

Frank E. Tolbert (1910–1980), Liberian politician
Frank X. Tolbert (1912–1984), American journalist